GURPS Illuminati University (1995), also called GURPS IOU, is a 128-page softbound campaign setting sourcebook for the GURPS role-playing game. Page 11 is notably the first printed appearance of Agatha Heterodyne, the star of the 2001 comic series Girl Genius.

Contents
The book details a fictional college where absurdity and awful puns are the order of the day; its students range from witches and werewolves to secret agents and space aliens. Adventures can involve joining fraternities, surviving dorm life, dealing with rampaging lab accidents, conquering other worlds on field trips, getting caught up in faculty bloodfeuds and even attempting to pass a class.

Characters from every GURPS setting can be fitted into the campaign with little or no difficulty. The setting shares much in common with the equally bizarre game Teenagers from Outer Space.  Agatha Heterodyne, from the Foglios' Girl Genius, is also featured in the book.

School structure
IOU is divided into nine major schools of teaching, listed here, along with a sampling of the departments each contains.

 School of Weird and Unnatural Sciences & Engineering (WUSE)Mad scientists have to study, too.
 Department of Recreational Biochemistry
 Department of Rude Engineering 
 Department of Weird Science and Culinary Studies ("Can we eat it, or will it eat us?")
 College of Obscure and Unhealthy Professions (COUP)Where straight professionals are set crooked.
 Department of Dirty Tricks
 School of Law
 Department of Technical Difficulties
 College of Temporal Happenstance, Ultimate Lies & Historical Undertakings (C.T.H.U.L.H.U.; the periods are meant to be pronounced) Whenever you go, then you are.
 Department of Ancient History
 Department of Future History
 School of Conservative Arts (SCA) Today the lemonade stand, tomorrow, the world!
 Department of Empire-Building
 School of Performing & Creative Arts (SPCA) "There's no business like show business" doesn't even begin to describe it.
 Department of Melodrama
 Department of  Cinematography
 College of Metaphysics (CoM) Sufficiently advanced magic is indistinguishable from technology. So there!
 Department of Applied Theology
 Department of Political Thaumaturgy
 College of Communications (CoC) Fnord. Ketchup is a Vegetable. Big Brother Loves Lucy.
 Department of Disinformation
 School of Social Anti-Sciences (SSAS) We have never made a profit! We don't do useful things here! We devote ourselves to pure Art and Research!
 English Department
 Department of Misanthropology
 College of Zen Surrealism (CZS) Ommmms! Ommmms for the poor!
 Department of Inapplicable Mathematics

Due to the extremely dangerous nature of the academic work done at IOU, many of the staff undergo The Treatment, a mysterious and dreaded procedure that makes them virtually unkillable and thus immune to their own recklessness. In addition, there are resurrection facilities on campus for student use.

Academic rivalries at IOU tend to result in extreme violence, property damage, and mayhem. There are rules to such conflicts (Faculty Bloodfeuds), one of which is that "freshthings" in their first semester are off-limits and harm done to them will attract the unfavorable attention of the Archdean.

Any student asking what the "O" in "IOU" stands for will be told he or she isn't cleared for that information.

Publication history
GURPS Illuminati University was published as a 128-page softbound sourcebook by Steve Jackson Games. The authors are Elizabeth McCoy and Walter Milliken; the illustrations are by Phil Foglio and Kaja Foglio.

The setting began life as an online campaign run on the Steve Jackson Games BBS Illuminati Online. It was codified into a book for the Third Edition of GURPS. There have been no announced plans to officially update the setting for 2004's Fourth Edition ruleset.

Reception
Rick Swan reviewed GURPS IOU: Illuminati University for Dragon magazine #228 (April 1996). Noting SJG's success with the Illuminati: New World Order card game, he commented that "despite its title, GURPS IOU has nothing to do with cards. Nor, for that matter, does it have much to do with the GURPS Illuminati supplement of a few years back. IOU looks like a setting for the GURPS role-playing game – and indeed, it has its share of game stats and adventure hooks – but the anything-goes, logic-down-the-dumper approach makes it virtually unplayable, at least by anyone who takes their games even semi-seriously. So what is it? Basically, IOU is a glorified joke book, a drop of Monty Python mixed with a bucket of Three Stooges." Swan concluded his review by saying: "Maybe you consider yourself too sophisticated for silly stuff like this. But you've gotta admit – Democrats for Cthulhu, that’s pretty good."

References

External links
GURPS Illuminati University at Steve Jackson Games
Independent review at RPGnet
Masonic references in games (Grand Lodge of British Columbia and Yukon)

Campaign settings
Comedy role-playing games
Fictional universities and colleges
Illuminati University
Role-playing game supplements introduced in 1995